This was the first edition of the event.

Balázs Taróczy won the title, defeating Adriano Panatta 6–3, 6–2 in the final.

Seeds

  Harold Solomon (quarterfinals)
  Vitas Gerulaitis (quarterfinals)
  Balázs Taróczy (champion)
  Heinz Günthardt (quarterfinals)
  Adriano Panatta (semifinals)
  Željko Franulović (quarterfinals)
  Mark Cox (first round)
  Peter Elter (first round)

Draw

Finals

Top half

Bottom half

External links
 ATP main draw

1980 in Swiss sport
1980 Grand Prix (tennis)
1980 Geneva Open